Elizabeth Ann Danto is professor emeritus of social welfare at Hunter College, City University of New York. She is the author of Freud's Free Clinics: Psychoanalysis & Social Justice, 1918-1938 (2005) which received both the Gradiva Award and the Goethe Prize, and Historical Research (2008). Dr. Danto writes and lectures internationally on the history of psychoanalysis as a system of thought and a marker of urban culture.

Selected works
Freud/Tiffany – Anna Freud, Dorothy Tiffany Burlingham and the ‘Best Possible School’ (co-edited with A. Steiner-Strauss) Routledge, History of Psychoanalysis Series, 2018
Historical Research. Oxford University Press, 2008.
Freud's Free Clinics: Psychoanalysis & Social Justice, 1918-1938. Columbia University Press, 2005.

Notes

Further reading
"Interview with Elizabeth Ann Danto", Columbia University Press.
Turner, Christopher. "Naughty Children", London Review of Books, Vol. 27 No. 19, 6 October 2005.

Hunter College faculty
Living people
Year of birth missing (living people)